Nessie is a nickname of the Loch Ness Monster, a cryptid that reputedly inhabits the Loch Ness lake in Scotland. Another  nickname is LOTTIE although it is less commonly used. 

Nessie or NESSIE may also refer to:


People
 Andrew Nesbitt Nessie Snedden (1892–1968), New Zealand cricketer
 Nessie Stewart-Brown (1864–1958), British suffragist and politician

Fictional characters
 Renesmee Carlie Cullen or Nessie, in the novel Breaking Dawn, part of the Twilight series 
 Vanessa Kapatelis or Nessie, in the Wonder Woman comic books
 Nessie, an amphibious character in the Boneyard comic book series
 Nessie, in Kaiju ouji, a Japanese tokusatsu/kaiju television series

Other uses
 NESSIE or New European Schemes for Signatures, Integrity and Encryption, a European research project to identify secure cryptographic primitives
 Mitsubishi Nessie, a concept automobile
 Tropical cyclone Nessie, in the 1973–74 South Pacific cyclone season
 Nessie Rock in Antarctica

See also
 National Survey of Student Engagement (NSSE), a survey instrument for student participation levels at universities and colleges in Canada and the United States
 Nessi